This is a list of 244 species in Scelio, a genus of parasitoid wasps in the family Platygastridae.

Scelio species

 Scelio acontes Kozlov & Lê, 1988 i c g
 Scelio acte Walker, 1846 i c g
 Scelio aegyptiacus Priesner, 1951 i c g
 Scelio afer Kieffer, 1905 i c g
 Scelio africanus Risbec, 1950 i c g
 Scelio alfierii Priesner, 1951 i c g
 Scelio amoenus Dodd, 1927 i c g
 Scelio ancilla Kozlov & Lê, 1988 i c g
 Scelio anmarae Dangerfield & Austin, 2001 i c g
 Scelio annae Dangerfield & Austin, 2001 i c g
 Scelio antorides Nixon, 1958 i c g
 Scelio anyirambo Dangerfield & Austin, 2001 i c g
 Scelio apo Kozlov & Lê, 1988 i c g
 Scelio approbatus Kozlov & Kononova, 1990 i c g
 Scelio aratigena Kieffer, 1913 i c g
 Scelio arion Kozlov & Lê, 1988 i c g
 Scelio asperatus Dodd, 1927 i c g
 Scelio auronitens Kieffer, 1910 i c g
 Scelio aurosparsus Kieffer, 1910 i c g
 Scelio australiensis Kieffer, 1905 i c g
 Scelio bakeri Kieffer, 1908 i c g
 Scelio baoli Risbec, 1950 i c g
 Scelio bengalensis Mukerjee, 1979 i c g
 Scelio bicolor Fouts, 1930 i c g
 Scelio bipartitus Kieffer, 1907 i c g
 Scelio bisectus Kieffer, 1914 i c g
 Scelio borroloolensis Dangerfield & Austin, 2001 i c g
 Scelio brasiliensis Kieffer, 1910 i c g
 Scelio bronae Dangerfield & Austin, 2001 i c g
 Scelio cahirensis Priesner, 1951 i c g
 Scelio calcuttaensis Mani, 1936 i c g
 Scelio callimone Kozlov & Lê, 1988 i c g
 Scelio caloptenorum Riley, 1886 i c g
 Scelio calopterus Kieffer, 1909 i c g
 Scelio cellularis Kieffer, 1916 i c g
 Scelio ceto Kozlov & Lê, 1988 i c g
 Scelio chapmanni Nixon, 1958 i c g
 Scelio cheops Nixon, 1958 i c g
 Scelio chortoicetes Froggatt, 1910 i c g
 Scelio cinctus Kozlov & Kononova, 1990 i c g
 Scelio clarus Fouts, 1934 i c g
 Scelio commixtus Muesebeck, 1972 i c g
 Scelio concinnus Dodd, 1927 i c g
 Scelio conformis Muesebeck, 1972 i c g
 Scelio conon Kozlov & Lê, 1988 i c g
 Scelio consobrinus Kieffer, 1913 i c g
 Scelio contractus Dodd, 1927 i c g
 Scelio coriaceiventris Kieffer, 1908 i c g
 Scelio coriaceus Kozlov & Kononova, 1990 i c g
 Scelio corion Nixon, 1958 i c g
 Scelio correctus Kozlov & Kononova, 1990 i c g
 Scelio crassellus Dodd, 1920 i c g
 Scelio crassiceps Priesner, 1951 i c g
 Scelio croces Kozlov & Lê, 1988 i c g
 Scelio cruentatus Dodd, 1914 i c g
 Scelio desinens Kozlov & Kononova, 1990 i c g
 Scelio dhupgarhi Mukerjee, 1979 i c g
 Scelio dichropli De Santis & Loiacono, 1993 i c g
 Scelio diemenensis Dodd, 1914 i c g
 Scelio difficilis Priesner, 1951 i c g
 Scelio dion Kozlov & Lê, 1988 i c g
 Scelio doddi Dangerfield & Austin, 2001 i c g
 Scelio dodes Kozlov & Lê, 1988 i c g
 Scelio dones Kozlov & Lê, 1988 i c g
 Scelio elongatus Kieffer, 1908 i c g
 Scelio ernstii Riley, 1886 i c g
 Scelio erythrogaster Kieffer, 1908 i c g
 Scelio erythropoda Cameron, 1888 i c g
 Scelio erythropus Dodd, 1920 i c g
 Scelio evanescens Kozlov & Kononova, 1990 i c g
 Scelio exaratus (Kieffer, 1910) i c g
 Scelio facialis Kieffer, 1916 i c g
 Scelio festivus Kieffer, 1910 i c g
 Scelio flavibarbis (Marshall, 1874) i c g
 Scelio flavicornis Dodd, 1913 i c g
 Scelio flavicoxis Kieffer, 1905 i c g
 Scelio flavigaster Dangerfield & Austin, 2001 i c g
 Scelio flavocinctus Kieffer, 1910 i c g
 Scelio floridanus Ashmead, 1893 i c g b
 Scelio floridus Kozlov & Kononova, 1990 i c g
 Scelio fomes Kozlov & Lê, 1988 i c g
 Scelio fritzi De Santis & Loiacono, 1993 i c g
 Scelio fulgidus Crawford, 1911 i c g
 Scelio fulvipes Förster, 1856 i c g
 Scelio fulvithorax Dodd, 1927 i c g
 Scelio furcatus Kieffer, 1909 i c g
 Scelio fuscicoxis Kieffer, 1905 i c g
 Scelio gallowayi Dangerfield & Austin, 2001 i c g
 Scelio gaudens Nixon, 1958 i c g
 Scelio gobar Walker, 1839 i c g
 Scelio goron Kozlov & Lê, 1988 i c g
 Scelio gracilis Kozlov & Kononova, 1990 i c g
 Scelio grbini Dangerfield & Austin, 2001 i c g
 Scelio grongtes Kozlov & Lê, 1988 i c g
 Scelio guatemalensis Kieffer, 1906 i c g
 Scelio habilis Nixon, 1958 i c g
 Scelio hieroglyphi Timberlake, 1932 i c g
 Scelio hilaris De Santis & Loiacono, 1993 i c g
 Scelio homona Kozlov & Lê, 1988 i c g
 Scelio horai Mani, 1936 i c g
 Scelio howardi Crawford, 1910 i c g
 Scelio husseini Priesner, 1951 i c g
 Scelio hyalinipennis Ashmead, 1887 i c g
 Scelio hypena Kozlov & Lê, 1988 i c g
 Scelio ignobilis Dodd, 1927 i c g
 Scelio improcerus Dodd, 1927 i c g
 Scelio incertus Muesebeck, 1972 i c g
 Scelio inermis (Zetterstedt, 1840) i c g
 Scelio insolitus Muesebeck, 1972 i c g
 Scelio integer Kieffer, 1908 i c g
 Scelio javanicus Roepke, 1916 i c g
 Scelio jokentae Dangerfield & Austin, 2001 i c g
 Scelio joni Dangerfield & Austin, 2001 i c g
 Scelio levifrons Kieffer, 1908 i c g
 Scelio lineolatus Kozlov & Kononova, 1990 i c g
 Scelio littoralis Dodd, 1927 i c g
 Scelio locustae Dodd, 1914 i c g
 Scelio longiventris Kieffer, 1908 i c g
 Scelio loretanus De Santis & Loiacono, 1993 i c g
 Scelio lugens Kieffer, 1910 i c g
 Scelio luzonicus Kieffer, 1914 i c g
 Scelio macrotomus Kieffer, 1916 i c g
 Scelio magnus Kozlov & Kononova, 1990 i c g
 Scelio mallapura Mukerjee, 1979 i c g
 Scelio mannesi Dangerfield & Austin, 2001 i c g
 Scelio marbis Nixon, 1958 i c g
 Scelio mareebaensis Dangerfield & Austin, 2001 i c g
 Scelio maritimus Kozlov & Kononova, 1990 i c g
 Scelio matthewsi Dangerfield & Austin, 2001 i c g
 Scelio mauritanicus Risbec, 1950 i c g
 Scelio meridionalis Dangerfield & Austin, 2001 i c g
 Scelio microcerus Kieffer, 1916 i c g
 Scelio mikei Dangerfield & Austin, 2001 i c g
 Scelio mimaces Kozlov & Lê, 1988 i c g
 Scelio munnaricus Mukerjee, 1979 i c g
 Scelio muraii Watanabe, 1955 i c g
 Scelio nakhlensis Priesner, 1951 i c g
 Scelio nanocuspis Dangerfield & Austin, 2001 i c g
 Scelio naumanni Dangerfield & Austin, 2001 i c g
 Scelio nerion Kozlov & Lê, 1988 i c g
 Scelio nigricornis Dodd, 1913 i c g
 Scelio nigricoxa Dodd, 1914 i c g
 Scelio nigriscutellum Dodd, 1913 i c g
 Scelio nigrobrunneus Dodd, 1927 i c g
 Scelio nikolskyi Ogloblin, 1927 i c g
 Scelio nilamburensis Mukerjee, 1979 i c g
 Scelio nisa Kozlov, 1972 i c g
 Scelio nitens Brues, 1906 i c g
 Scelio noancilla Kozlov & Lê, 2000 i c g
 Scelio notabilis Dodd, 1927 i c g
 Scelio odites Kozlov & Lê, 1988 i c g
 Scelio oedipodae Ashmead, 1893 i c g
 Scelio opacus (Provancher, 1887) i c g
 Scelio orientalis Dodd, 1915 i c g
 Scelio oviphagus Mukerji, 1953 i c g
 Scelio ovivorus (Riley, 1878) i c g
 Scelio oxyae Timberlake, 1932 i c g
 Scelio paivai Mani, 1936 i c g
 Scelio pakistanensis Siddiqui et al., 1983 i c g
 Scelio pakistanicus Mahmood et al., 1988 i c g
 Scelio pallidipes Ashmead, 1893 i c g
 Scelio paracroces Kozlov & Lê, 2000 i c g
 Scelio paraensis Kieffer, 1910 i c g
 Scelio paraspinifera Kozlov & Lê, 1988 i c g
 Scelio parvicornis Dodd, 1914 i c g
 Scelio pembertoni Timberlake, 1932 i c g
 Scelio perspicuus Dodd, 1927 i c g
 Scelio petilus Dangerfield & Austin, 2001 i c g
 Scelio philippinensis Ashmead, 1905 i c g
 Scelio pigotti Dangerfield & Austin, 2001 i c g
 Scelio pilosifrons Dodd, 1927 i c g
 Scelio pilosus Dodd, 1913 i c g
 Scelio planithorax Dodd, 1927 i c g
 Scelio plasticus Kozlov & Kononova, 1990 i c g
 Scelio poecilopterus Priesner, 1951 i c g
 Scelio popovi Nixon, 1958 i c g
 Scelio princeps Nixon, 1958 i c g
 Scelio psenes Kozlov & Lê, 1988 i c g
 Scelio pseudaustralis Dangerfield & Austin, 2001 i c g
 Scelio pulchripennis Brues, 1906 i c g
 Scelio pumilus Muesebeck, 1972 i c g
 Scelio punctaticeps Dodd, 1914 i c g
 Scelio remaudierei Ferrière, 1952 i c g
 Scelio reticulatum Dangerfield & Austin, 2001 i c g
 Scelio rubripes Kieffer, 1908 i c g
 Scelio rufiventris Kozlov & Kononova, 1990 i c g
 Scelio rufonotatus Kieffer, 1906 i c g
 Scelio rufulus Muesebeck, 1972 i c g
 Scelio rugosulus Latreille, 1805 i c g
 Scelio rugosus Kozlov & Kononova, 1990 i c g
 Scelio rusticus De Santis & Loiacono, 1993 i c g
 Scelio ruticulus Kozlov & Kononova, 1990 i c g
 Scelio rutilus Kozlov & Kononova, 1990 i c g
 Scelio satpurus Mukerjee, 1979 i c g
 Scelio schmelio Dangerfield & Austin, 2001 i c g
 Scelio scottusae Ogloblin, 1965 i c g
 Scelio scyllinopsi Ogloblin, 1965 i c g
 Scelio sectigena Kieffer, 1908 i c g
 Scelio semiatratus De Santis & Loiacono, 1993 i c g
 Scelio semirufus Muesebeck, 1972 i c g
 Scelio semisanguineus Girault, 1914 i c g
 Scelio serdangensis Timberlake, 1932 i c g
 Scelio setafascis Dangerfield & Austin, 2001 i c g
 Scelio setiger Brues, 1918 i c g
 Scelio similis Kozlov & Kononova, 1990 i c g
 Scelio singularis Muesebeck, 1972 i c g
 Scelio solus Muesebeck, 1972 i c g
 Scelio spinifera Mukerjee, 1979 i c g
 Scelio splendidus Kieffer, 1910 i c g
 Scelio squamosus Muesebeck, 1972 i c g
 Scelio striatifacies Dodd, 1914 i c g
 Scelio striatiscutum De Santis & Loiacono, 1993 i c g
 Scelio striativentris Kieffer, 1908 i c g
 Scelio striatus Priesner, 1951 i c g
 Scelio subpolitus Dodd, 1920 i c g
 Scelio sudanensis Ferrière, 1952 i c g
 Scelio sulcaticeps Dodd, 1927 i c g
 Scelio tasmaniensis Dangerfield & Austin, 2001 i c g
 Scelio taylori Nixon, 1958 i c g
 Scelio tenuipilosus De Santis & Loiacono, 1993 i c g
 Scelio thomsoni Kieffer, 1913 i c g
 Scelio transversalis Kozlov & Kononova, 1990 i c g
 Scelio travancoricus Mukerjee, 1979 i c g
 Scelio tripartitus Kieffer, 1906 i c g
 Scelio trisectus Kieffer, 1908 i c g
 Scelio tristis Nixon, 1958 i c g
 Scelio tsuruokensis Watanabe, 1955 i c g
 Scelio unidentis Dangerfield & Austin, 2001 i c g
 Scelio urgo Kozlov & Lê, 1988 i c g
 Scelio uvarovi Ogloblin, 1927 i c g
 Scelio vallecularis Kozlov & Kononova, 1990 i c g
 Scelio variegatus Kozlov & Kononova, 1990 i c g
 Scelio variicornis Kieffer, 1913 i c g
 Scelio variipennis Kieffer, 1916 i c g
 Scelio varipunctatus Dodd, 1915 i c g
 Scelio venatus Brues, 1906 i c g
 Scelio vulgaris Kieffer, 1908 i c g
 Scelio walkeri Kieffer, 1913 i c g
 Scelio wallacei Dodd, 1920 i c g
 Scelio wittmeri Priesner, 1951 i c g
 Scelio xanthopterus Kieffer, 1916 i c g
 Scelio zafari Mahmood et al., 1988 i c g
 Scelio zborowskii Dangerfield & Austin, 2001 i c g
 Scelio zolotarevskyi Ferrière, 1930 i c g

Data sources: i = ITIS, c = Catalogue of Life, g = GBIF, b = Bugguide.net

References

Scelio